Chaima Rahmouni (born 25 March 2001) is a Tunisian weightlifter. She represented Tunisia at the 2019 African Games held in Rabat, Morocco and she won the bronze medal in the women's 59kg event.

In 2020, she won the bronze medal in the women's 59kg Clean & Jerk event at the Roma 2020 World Cup in Rome, Italy.

She represented Tunisia at the 2020 Summer Olympics in Tokyo, Japan. She competed in the women's 64 kg event.

Achievements

References

External links 
 

Living people
2001 births
Place of birth missing (living people)
Tunisian female weightlifters
African Weightlifting Championships medalists
Competitors at the 2019 African Games
African Games medalists in weightlifting
African Games bronze medalists for Tunisia
Weightlifters at the 2020 Summer Olympics
Olympic weightlifters of Tunisia
21st-century Tunisian women